The Olimpíada de Matemática do Grande ABC (English:Grande ABC Mathematical Olympiad), or OMABC is a mathematical competition for pre-collegiate Brazilian students of Grande ABC region, composed by the following cities: 
 

  Santo André
  São Caetano do Sul 
  São Bernardo do Campo
  Diadema
  Mauá
  Ribeirão Pires
  Rio Grande da Serra

The Faculdade de Ciências Exatas e Tecnológicas da Universidade Metodista de São Paulo is the main organizator of this event, who create the tests and correct then. The main purpose of this olympiad is improve the mathematical knowledge, encouraging the study and research in scientific areas., and contributing to participate in national mathematical competitions, like Olimpíada Brasileira de Matemática das Escolas Públicas and Olimpíada Brasileira de Matemática. The first edition was held in 2004.

Awards

Students 

The participants are ranked based on their individual scores. Medals are awarded to the highest ranked participants, such that slightly less than half of them receive a medal. Subsequently, the cutoffs (minimum scores required to receive a gold, silver or bronze medal respectively) are chosen such that the ratio of gold to silver to bronze medals awarded approximates 1 : 2 : 3.

  Gold medal
  Silver medal
  Bronze medal

Schools 

Special prizes are awarded for the schools:

  Trophy: For the schools whose students received at least a  golden medal.
  Honorable Mention: For the schools at least one student received an award.

Champions of OMABC

Schools awarded with trophies

References

External links 
 OMABC - Olimpíada de Matemática do Grande ABC
 UMESP - Universidade Metodista de São Paulo
 IMPA - Instituto de Matemática Pura e Aplicada

Mathematics competitions